Elizaville may refer to:

Elizaville, Indiana, an unincorporated community in Boone County
Elizaville, Kentucky, a census-designated place and unincorporated community in Fleming County
Elizaville Cemetery, in Elizaville, Kentucky
Elizaville Presbyterian Church,  a historic church in Kentucky
Elizaville, New York, a hamlet in Columbia County